cis-3-Hexen-1-ol, also known as (Z)-3-hexen-1-ol and leaf alcohol, is a colorless oily liquid with an intense grassy-green odor of freshly cut green grass and leaves. It is produced in small amounts by most plants and it acts as an attractant to many predatory insects. cis-3-Hexen-1-ol is a very important aroma compound that is used in fruit and vegetable flavors and in perfumes. The yearly production is about 30 tonnes.

cis-3-Hexen-1-ol is an alcohol and its esters are also important flavor and fragrance raw materials. The related aldehyde cis-3-hexenal (leaf aldehyde) has a similar and even stronger smell but is relatively unstable and isomerizes into the conjugated trans-2-hexenal.

This compound has been recognized as a semiochemical involved in mechanisms and behaviors of attraction in diverse animals such as insects and mammals. However, there is no scientific evidence of its aphrodisiac effects in humans. The popular Mexican alcoholic beverage, mezcal, is found to have enhanced concentrations of this compound when a maguey worm is served in the glass.

Human odor perception
A pair of two single-nucleotide polymorphisms, both in the gene for the OR2J3 odor receptor, strongly reduce sensitivity to this odorant.

References

External links
 Pheromone database
 Molecule of the Month: Hexenal
 That Worm at the Bottom of Your Mezcal Isn’t a Total Lie

Flavors
Alkenols